Mina Waxin (born 29 April 2001) is a Swedish ice hockey player and member of the Swedish national team,  playing in the Swedish Women's Hockey League (SDHL) with Brynäs IF Dam.

She represented Sweden in the women's ice hockey tournament at the 2022 Winter Olympics in Beijing and at the IIHF Women's World Championships in 2019 and  2022.

References

External links

2001 births
Living people
Brynäs IF Dam players
Djurgårdens IF Hockey Dam players
Ice hockey people from Stockholm
Ice hockey players at the 2016 Winter Youth Olympics
Ice hockey players at the 2022 Winter Olympics
Modo Hockey Dam players
Olympic ice hockey players of Sweden
Swedish women's ice hockey defencemen
Youth Olympic gold medalists for Sweden